Robert Noble Jones  (1 August 1864–29 June 1942) was a New Zealand lawyer, public servant and land court judge. He was born in Belfast, County Antrim, Ireland, on 1 August 1864.

In the 1928 King's Birthday Honours, Jones was appointed a Commander of the Order of the British Empire.

References

1864 births
1942 deaths
Māori Land Court judges
New Zealand public servants
20th-century New Zealand judges
Lawyers from Belfast
Irish emigrants to New Zealand (before 1923)
New Zealand Commanders of the Order of the British Empire